Oyo Hotel & Casino (stylized as OYO Hotel & Casino) is a casino hotel near the Las Vegas Strip in Paradise, Nevada, United States.  It is owned by Highgate and Oyo Hotels & Homes, and its casino is operated by Paragon Gaming. It is located next to the Tropicana and across the street from the MGM Grand Las Vegas.  The hotel has 696 rooms with a  casino. Since opening in 1973, the property has been renamed several times, most recently as the Hôtel San Rémo (1989–2006) and the Hooters Casino Hotel (2006–2019).

History

Howard Johnson Hotel (1973–1975)
The hotel was originally a Howard Johnson's Motor Lodge. Construction of the hotel began in September 1972. The hotel was developed by a group of local businesspersons led by Paul Oesterle. It opened in June 1973 with 332 rooms, at a cost of $8 million. A gaming license was issued for the property later that year, allowing the operation of 150 slot machines. Oesterle had plans to expand the hotel by adding three 10-story towers with 544 new rooms.

In September 1974, Oesterle Nevada declared bankruptcy as it was unable to pay its debts. Eureka Federal Savings and Loan, holder of the hotel's mortgage, foreclosed on the property and bought it at auction for $7.7 million in March 1975.

Paradise Hotel (1975–1976)
In September 1975, Eureka sold the Howard Johnson's to Bernard Nemerov, a former part owner of the Riviera casino, for $10 million. Nemerov renamed it as the Paradise Hotel. He reopened the property's casino on New Year's Day 1976.

In June 1976, the Paradise was targeted in a credit scam by 54 mobsters associated with the Philadelphia crime family. The scheme left the casino with insufficient cash to operate, and it was forced to close and went bankrupt.

Ownership changes and renamings (1976–1989)
The property was purchased in 1977 by a group led by New York businessman Andrew DeLillo, who then renamed it as the 20th Century. It was later sold to Herb Pastor, owner of the Coin Castle and Golden Goose casinos in Downtown Las Vegas, who renamed the 20th Century as the Treasury Hotel.

Former football player Gerry Philbin purchased the Treasury in 1982 for $20 million; the casino closed at that time because Philbin had not obtained a gaming license, though the hotel continued to operate. By the end of the year, Philbin was forced to put the hotel into Chapter 11 bankruptcy protection.

In 1985, the DeLillo family regained ownership of the Treasury through foreclosure and renamed it as the Pacifica Hotel. It was announced that the Pacifica would be marketed to gay travelers, but this plan proved controversial and was soon abandoned. Later that year, the Pacifica was renamed as the Polynesian Hotel.

Hôtel San Rémo (1989–2006)

In 1989, it was purchased by Sukeaki Izumi, a Japanese industrialist and hotelier, who renovated it with an Italian Riviera ambience and renamed it the Hôtel San Rémo.  He paid a reported $30 million for the purchase and renovation. In 2002, the hotel, casino, and restaurants were refurbished.  The hotel had 711 rooms while the casino had 30,000 square feet (3,000 m2) of space.

In 2004, Izumi's company, Eastern and Western Hotel Corp., began looking for opportunities to grow the hotel, to take advantage of the heavy development at the intersection of Tropicana and Las Vegas Blvd. since 1989. Hooters approached with a redevelopment proposal. Ultimately, a group of nine partners in Hooters of America acquired a two-thirds interest in the property, which was put under control of a joint venture, 155 East Tropicana, LLC.  Plans were announced to redevelop the San Remo as a Hooters brand casino and hotel.   Hooters of America, owner of the Hooters trademark, would receive 2% of revenue as royalties.

All of the hotel rooms would be remodeled, the pool would be tripled in size, and the number of restaurants would be increased from 4 to 8 and include the second largest Hooters restaurant in the world. The renovations would reduce the number of rooms to 696 by converting rooms into larger suites.

Hooters Casino Hotel (2006–2019)
On February 2, 2006, the weekend of Super Bowl XL, Hooters Casino Hotel officially opened its doors with a large orange carpet welcoming not only the public but many stars including KISS bass player Gene Simmons.  Former Miami Dolphins quarterback Dan Marino opened Dan Marino's Fine Food and Spirits restaurant on the same day the casino/hotel opened.

In January 2007, 155 East Tropicana accepted an unsolicited offer from Hedwigs Las Vegas Top Tier, a joint venture of NTH Advisory Group and Silverleaf Real Estate, to buy the property for $225 million (including assumption of $130 million in debt).  Hedwigs planned to redesign and rebrand the casino once again, as a "lifestyle, entertainment-driven boutique hotel". Analysts called the agreement "curious" given Hooters's poor earnings performance. The deal fell through in June 2008 when Hedwigs failed to make a required payment.

With revenue declining, the casino began defaulting on loan payments in April 2009.  Canpartners Realty Holding Co., a subsidiary of Canyon Capital, bought up much of the company's debt at a heavy discount and planned to foreclose on the hotel. The owners, seeking to block foreclosure, filed for Chapter 11 bankruptcy in August 2011, listing only $63 million in assets against liabilities of $163 million. After a planned February 2012 auction attracted no outside bidders, the bankruptcy court approved Canpartner's $60 million credit offer for the property, with the sale expected to close around March 30. The Navegante Group was approved to manage casino operations, while Canyon Capital said it was seeking a major hotel chain to take over and rebrand the property.

In May 2015, Canyon Capital sold the casino to Trinity Hotel Investors, based in New York, for $70 million. At first, Trinity was expected to rename the property and place it under the management of Holiday Inn, but they later decided to retain the Hooters branding. Trinity hired Paragon Gaming to replace Navegante as the property's operator in 2016. The world's largest Steak 'n Shake restaurant, with seating for 200 people, opened inside the Hooters casino in March 2018.

Oyo Hotel & Casino (2019–present)
In August 2019, Oyo Hotels & Homes partnered with New York-based investment and management company Highgate to purchase the property for $135 million. They announced plans to rename it as Oyo Hotel & Casino Las Vegas later in the year. A renovation was scheduled to begin in mid-September 2019, and finished by the end of the year. The Hooters restaurant has been retained. The Oyo rebranding process began on September 16, 2019. The renovation will cost approximately $20 million, and includes upgrades to the restaurants.

Facilities and entertainment

Current shows include Motown Extreme, Cherry Boom Boom, Alain Nu - The Man Who Knows, and Hilarious 7.

Previous shows have included Prince tribute show Purple Reign, male revue Men of X, topless revue Raack N Roll, and The Dirty Joke Show. Comedian Bobby Slayton performed in the Night Owl Showroom from April 2007 to March 2009.

Hotel revenue
As of 2008, OYO (then Hooters) had one of the lowest gaming revenue for a Strip casino, but one of the highest ratios of non-gaming to gaming income. 
		

The casino had an operating loss of $5.55 million in 2006, $0.96 million in 2007, $6.19 million in 2008, and  $4.26 million for the first 9 months of 2009. The first quarter of 2010 the casino had an operating income of $11.23 million.

References

External links 

Skyscraper hotels in Paradise, Nevada
Casinos in the Las Vegas Valley
Hooters
Casinos completed in 1973
Hotels established in 1973
Hotel buildings completed in 1973
Casino hotels
1973 establishments in Nevada